The Prince Gustav Channel was named in 1903 after Crown Prince Gustav of Sweden (later King Gustav V) by Otto Nordenskiöld of the Swedish Antarctic Expedition.

The channel is bounded on the west by the Antarctic Peninsula and on the east by James Ross Island.

On 27 February 1995, the British Antarctic Survey (BAS) reported that an ice shelf formerly blocking the channel had disintegrated. This ice shelf had spanned approximately  prior to its disintegration.

Between February and March 2000, scientists collected sediment cores 5 to 6 m in length from the ocean floor. Carbon dating of organic material found in the sediment layers suggested that for a period between 2,000 and 5,000 years ago, much of the channel was seasonally open water. While icebergs were able to navigate the channel, ice rafted debris was deposited within the sediment.

Prince Gustav Ice Shelf retreated in the mid-Holocene period 5000 to 2000 years before present, [this] "corresponds to regional climate warming deduced from other paleoenvironmental records."

It appears that before and after this period, the channel remained closed. The period when the channel was open coincides with a period of local warming supported by data gathered from land-based studies of lake sediments and ancient, abandoned penguin rookeries. With the return of colder conditions about 1900 years ago, the Prince Gustav Ice Shelf reformed until its recent retreat and collapse.

Ice shelves are sensitive indicators of regional climatic change, therefore recent warming in the vicinity of the Prince Gustav Channel is exceptional for at least the past 1900 years.

San Nicolás Refuge 
San Nicolás Refuge   is an Argentine Antarctic refuge located on the north coast of the entrance to the Prince Gustav Channel, on the Trinity Peninsula, at the northern tip of the Antarctic Peninsula. The refuge is administered by the Argentine Army and was inaugurated on 12 September 1963.

It is one of the 18 shelters that are under the responsibility of the Esperanza Base, which is responsible for the maintenance and the care. The Argentine Antarctic Program reports that the refuge is inactive.

See also
 List of Antarctic field camps

References

Channels of the Southern Ocean
Straits of Graham Land
Landforms of James Ross Island